Pyncostola bohemiella is a moth of the family Gelechiidae. It is found from central and southern Europe to the Ural Mountains. It is also found in North Africa, where it has been recorded from Tunisia.

The forewings are yellow and the hindwings are grey. Adults have been recorded on wing from May to June.

The larvae have been recorded feeding on the roots of Achillea millefolium.

References

Moths described in 1864
Pyncostola
Moths of Europe